The first USS Leyden was a screw steamer that operated as a tug in the U.S. Navy from 1866 to 1903 and saw combat service in the Spanish–American War in 1898.

History

Leyden was launched in 1865 by James Tetlow, Chelsea, Massachusetts. From 1866 to 1879 she operated as a yard tug at the Boston Navy Yard, performing various harbor duties out of Boston, Massachusetts, until reassigned to Portsmouth, New Hampshire, in 1879. Leyden served there until 1897, when she was assigned to Newport, Rhode Island. While the ship was near Boston on 26 August 1881, Seaman Michael Thornton jumped overboard and rescued a fellow sailor from drowning, for which he was awarded the Medal of Honor.

In 1898, Leyden performed towing operations off Cuba during the Spanish–American War. She also fought at the Battle of Fajardo the night of 8–9 August, bombarding enemy positions to support bluejackets from  holding the Cape San Juan Light against a Spanish ground attack. The next morning, Leyden transported 60 women and children from the town of Fajardo that had been quartered at the lighthouse to Ponce, Puerto Rico.

From 1898 to 1903, Leyden alternated her services between the Caribbean and Newport, Rhode Island. While on a return passage from Puerto Rico on 21 January 1903, the tug foundered in heavy fog off Block Island, ending her lengthy career.  Ordinary Seaman Ernest H. Bjorkman, Fireman First Class Loddie Stupka, Quartermaster Third Class August P. Teytand, and Chief Machinist Michael Walsh received the Medal of Honor "for heroism at the time of the wreck of that vessel".

Awards
 Sampson Medal
 Spanish Campaign Medal

Notes

References 
Online sources

External links
 Photo gallery at Naval Historical Center

Tugs of the United States Navy
Ships built in Chelsea, Massachusetts
1865 ships
Spanish–American War auxiliary ships of the United States
Shipwrecks of the Rhode Island coast
Shipwrecks in the Atlantic Ocean
Maritime incidents in 1903